Brattberg is a surname. Notable people with the surname include:

Fredrik Brattberg (born 1978), Norwegian playwright
Johan Brattberg (born 1996), Swedish footballer